Wautoma is a city in Waushara County, Wisconsin, United States. The population was 2,218 at the 2010 census. Wautoma is the county seat of Waushara County.

The city consists of three noncontiguous areas: one is entirely within the Town of Wautoma, the second is entirely within the Town of Dakota, and the third straddles the boundary between the two towns.

Wautoma calls itself the "Christmas tree capital of the world".

On August 29, 1992, the town was struck by a half-mile wide F-3 tornado, killing  2 people, injuring 30 others, and causing over $5 million in damage.

Geography

Demographics

2010 census
As of the census of 2010, there were 2,218 people, 945 households, and 487 families living in the city. The racial makeup of the city was 88.3% White, 1.4% African American, 0.7% Native American, 0.4% Asian, 6.3% from other races, and 2.9% from two or more races. Hispanic or Latino of any race were 15.8% of the population.

There were 945 households, of which 28.7% had children under the age of 18 living with them, 32.6% were married couples living together, 14.4% had a female householder with no husband present, 4.6% had a male householder with no wife present, and 48.5% were non-families. 44.1% of all households were made up of individuals, and 21.7% had someone living alone who was 65 years of age or older. The average household size was 2.21 and the average family size was 3.13.

The median age in the city was 35.4 years. 25.3% of residents were under the age of 18; 9.5% were between the ages of 18 and 24; 25.2% were from 25 to 44; 22.8% were from 45 to 64; and 17.2% were 65 years of age or older. The gender makeup of the city was 50.5% male and 49.5% female.

2000 census
As of the census of 2000, there were 1,998 people, 806 households, and 429 families living in the city. The population density was 800.8 people per square mile (308.6/km2). There were 877 housing units at an average density of 351.5 per square mile (135.4/km2). The racial makeup of the city was 94.04% White, 1.10% Black or African American, 0.70% Native American, 0.85% Asian, 2.00% from other races, and 1.30% from two or more races. 7.21% of the population were Hispanic or Latino of any race.

There were 806 households, out of which 27.2% had children under the age of 18 living with them, 37.7% were married couples living together, 11.0% had a female householder with no husband present, and 46.7% were non-families. 40.4% of all households were made up of individuals, and 20.1% had someone living alone who was 65 years of age or older. The average household size was 2.20 and the average family size was 3.04.

In the city, the population was spread out, with 24.0% under the age of 18, 9.4% from 18 to 24, 25.5% from 25 to 44, 17.6% from 45 to 64, and 23.5% who were 65 years of age or older. The median age was 39 years. For every 100 females, there were 98.2 males. For every 100 females age 18 and over, there were 89.5 males.

The median income for a household in the city was $31,723, and the median income for a family was $37,500. Males had a median income of $27,546 versus $19,648 for females. The per capita income for the city was $16,006. About 5.2% of families and 11.5% of the population were below the poverty line, including 10.7% of those under age 18 and 18.3% of those age 65 or over.

Transportation
Wautoma is served by the Wautoma Municipal Airport .

Media

News media
 The Waushara Argus is the weekly newspaper.

Radio
 WAUH radio broadcasts at 102.3 FM.

High school sports
Wautoma High School has won five state championships, three in boys' track and field, one in boys' basketball, and one in football. In 1980, Wautoma High School won the Class B State Basketball Championship.

Notable people

 Jared Abbrederis, Green Bay Packers,  Detroit Lions, and Wisconsin Badgers wide receiver
 Robert E. Behnke, Wisconsin State Representative
 William Belter, Wisconsin State Representative
 Robyn J. Blader, U.S. National Guard general
 George M. Byse, Wisconsin State Representative
 Boyd A. Clark, Wisconsin State Representative and jurist
 Richard W. Hubbell, Wisconsin State Representative
 Edward F. Kileen, Wisconsin State Senator
 Robert L. D. Potter, Wisconsin State Senator
Jon Wilcox Wisconsin State Representative, Wisconsin Chief Judge, Wisconsin Supreme Court Justice
 June Wandrey, World War II veteran, writer
 William C. Webb, Wisconsin and Kansas politician and jurist

Images

See also
 List of cities in Wisconsin

References

External links

 
 Wautoma Public Library
 Wautoma Farmer's Union
 Sanborn fire insurance map: 1911

Cities in Waushara County, Wisconsin
Cities in Wisconsin
County seats in Wisconsin